Ayomide Babatunde Badmus (28 February 1986) is a Nigerian footballer who plays as a forward. Babatunde has played for ONGC F.C. in 2010–11 I-League in which he scored 11 goals before his club was relegated.

Career

ONGC F.C.
Badmus Babatunde was a star scorer, as he guided ONGC F.C. to promotion after finishing undefeated in the Final Round of the 2010 I-League 2nd Division. They finished runners-up to the Sanquelim-based SESA Football Academy in the Group-B, but in the Final Round, ONGC's unbeaten run meant they won the 2010 I-League 2nd Division and were promoted to the 2010-11 I-League.
Babatunde had scored against Vasco S.C. in the 1-0 win, then against Malabar United in the 3-1 win, against Oil India in the 4-1 win, against HAL in 2-1 win, once in these consecutive matches.

In the 2010-11 I-League, he scored a brace in the 2-5 loss against Dempo S.C. in September 2010. In December, he scored against AIFF XI at the Tau Devi Lal Stadium in the 1-1 draw.
He scored a brace against Prayag United S.C. in the 2-4 loss in January.
He shocked the East Bengal F.C. by scoring in a 1-0 win in February.
He had scored the only goal for his side in the 1-2 loss against Air India in March 2011. In April 2011, he again scored a brace against Churchill Brothers S.C. to shock the Salcette-based side to a 3-3 draw at Fatorda Stadium.
On a must-win home match against Mumbai F.C. in May 2011, he scored to give a 2-0 lead, but it finally ended 2-2, and ONGC F.C. were again relegated on a head-to-head basis He had finished with 11 goals in the 2010-11 I-League.

Rangdajied United
In January 2012, the Shillong-based club Ar-Hima, later renamed as Rangdajied United F.C., signed Babatunde.
In the Group 1 of 2012 I-League 2nd Division, he scored once against Bhawanipore F.C. in the 3-3 draw at Silchar. However, they failed to qualify to the Final Round as they finished 3rd in the Group Stage.
In the 2013 I-League 2nd Division, he scored in the 1-1 draw in the opening match against Southern Samity. Thereafter, he had a lean run in the 1st leg of the final round. But he finished the final round with successive hat-tricks against Langsning F.C. (3-1 win on 22 April), and then against Southern Samity (3-1 win on 24 April), which helped his side catapult past Bhawanipore F.C. to be the runners-up, and earn promotion to the 2013–14 I-League. Babatunde became the highest scorer with 8 goals, along with Bhawanipore F.C.'s Hudson Lima Da Silva.

Later career
Following his time with Rangdajied United, Babatunde signed with Royal Wahingdoh and Gangtok Himalayan and played in the I-League 2nd Division with the clubs. He then signed with Chennai United in the CFA First Division in 2016.

References

External links 
 

1986 births
Living people
Yoruba sportspeople
I-League players
Association football forwards
Nigerian expatriate sportspeople in India
Expatriate footballers in India
Nigerian footballers
Royal Wahingdoh FC players
Rangdajied United F.C. players
Chirag United Club Kerala players
Salgaocar FC players
ONGC FC players
I-League 2nd Division players